Dinesh Singh (nickname Babu) is an Indian politician from Punjab and a member of Bharatiya Janta Party (BJP). He is a former MLA from Sujanpur & Ex Deputy Speaker of Punjab Legislative Assembly.

Early life

Singh was born on 17 June 1962. His father's name is Bhim Singh.

Political career

Singh was General Secretary of Akhil Bharatiya Vidyarthi Parishad (Pathankot). He was elected to the Punjab Legislative Assembly in 2007 from Sujanpur. He was re-elected in 2012. Since 20 March 2012, he has been Deputy Speaker of Punjab Legislative Assembly.

References

1962 births
Punjab, India MLAs 2007–2012
Punjab, India MLAs 2012–2017
People from Pathankot district
Living people
Deputy Speakers of the Punjab Legislative Assembly
Bharatiya Janata Party politicians from Punjab
Punjab, India MLAs 2017–2022